Aristote Nkaka Bazunga (born 27 March 1996) is a Belgian professional footballer who plays as a midfielder for Belgian First Division A club Anderlecht. Mainly a defensive midfielder, he can also play as a centre back.

Club career
Nkaka signed for Mouscron in June 2015, arriving from the Club Brugge academy. He scored his first goal in a 2–1 loss against his previous club, Brugge, on 26 January 2017.

On 17 July 2019, Nkaka was loaned to Segunda División side UD Almería from Anderlecht, for one year. He made his debut for the club on 17 August, coming off the bench and scoring the third in a 3–0 home defeat of Albacete Balompié.

On 26 August 2019, Nkaka's loan with the Andalusians was terminated due to the club's change of ownership, and agreed to a one-year loan deal with fellow league team Racing de Santander just hours later.

On 31 August 2021, he joined Waasland-Beveren on loan with an option to buy.

International career
Nkaka was born in Belgium and is of Congolese descent.

References

External links
 
 Nkaka MadeinFoot Profile
 Nkaka Sport BE Profile
 

1996 births
Living people
Footballers from Hainaut (province)
Belgian people of Democratic Republic of the Congo descent
Belgian footballers
Association football midfielders
Belgian Pro League players
Segunda División players
2. Bundesliga players
Challenger Pro League players
K.V. Oostende players
R.S.C. Anderlecht players
UD Almería players
Racing de Santander players
SC Paderborn 07 players
S.K. Beveren players
Belgium under-21 international footballers
Belgian expatriate footballers
Belgian expatriate sportspeople in Spain
Expatriate footballers in Spain
Belgian expatriate sportspeople in Germany
Expatriate footballers in Germany